Galdieri is a surname. Notable people with the surname include:

James Anthony Galdieri (1934–2009), American politician, son of James J.
James J. Galdieri (1896–1944), American politician
Michele Galdieri (1902–1965), Italian screenwriter, songwriter, and lyricist